The  is an archaeological site with the ruins of a moated Yayoi period settlement located in the Niikura neighborhood of Wakō, Saitama in the Kantō region of Japan. The site was designated a National Historic Site of Japan in 2020.

Overview
The Gobōyama Site is located on the hill on the northern edge of the Musashino Terrace on the right bank of the Arakawa River at an elevation of 24 meters. The ruins extend over an area 250 meters from east-to-west by 200 meters north-to-south in the eastern part of the ruins, and 150 meters in the west, on the southern slope of an independent hill. On the site are remains from the Japanese Paleolithic period to the early modern period, but the main remains are from the middle to the latter half of the Yayoi period.

According to legend, this was once the location of a palace of an exiled a prince from Silla, one of the ancient Korean kingdoms, as the "Shinpen Musashi Fudokisho" lists the site as "the ruins of the Silla royal residence". It has long been recognized that this area was some kind of archaeological site, as earthenware and bronze mirrors have been collected by local residents, but academic research was only conducted since 1979. By 2011, a total of 15 excavations have been conducted. As a result, the foundations of 152 pit dwellings, three moats, and five square girder tombs have been discovered. From the morphology of the foundations and various artifacts uncovered, the building sites have been dated:

3 from late middle Yayoi period
13 from early late Yayoi period
27 from middle late Yayoi period
23 from late Yayoi period
9 from final Yayoi period

Three moats were found around the settlement, which has been labelled A, B and C by archaeologists. The A moat encircles the settlement with a maximum width of 3.2 meters, a maximum depth of 1.7 meters, and a long axis of 153 meters. The B moat is almost parallel to the A moat, but is interrupted at the cliff on the north side of the settlement. It has a maximum width of 1.8 meters, maximum depth of 0.95 meters, and a major axis of 172 meters. The distance between the A and B moats is 7 to 12 meters. It is uncertain if the moats were dug simultaneously, or if the B moat was dug later, but it is known that both moats existed at the same time, indicating that the settlement had a double moat. The C moat was found to the west of the settlement, 60 meters outside the B moat, but only a seven meter section was found, so its overall scale is unknown. This portion has a width of 1.8 meters and depth of 1.2 meters. Moats A and B did not exist in the earliest period of the settlement, but were constructed in the first half of the late Yayoi period. The latter half of the Yayoi period was a period of war, which was described in Chinese history books as the Civil War of Wa. Many lowland Yayoi settlements were abandoned, and new settlements were constructed on hilltop locations, with defensive moats, earthen ramparts and wooden palisades. While this settlement was located in the lowlands, it was fortified with double moats and presumably a wooden palisade, which was unusual for the Kantō region. The Yayoi pottery chronology at this site is not directly continuous, and there may have been a blank period between the middle and late Yayoi phases in which the settlement was abandoned, and later resettled, which also approximately corresponds to the time in which the settlement was fortified.

The five square-type kofun at this site are located on the southeast side of the village, outside the A and B ditches. From that position, it can be seen that the living area and the grave area were clearly separated. The preservation of these tumuli is poor as the area was disturbed by cultivation, and it is uncertain if they were once moated.

Excavated pottery at this site is not only from the south Kantō region, but also from the Chūbu highlands and the Tōkai region. In addition, copper swords and three items of earthenware shaped like dōtaku were excavated. This was a surprising find, as it is rare so many dōtaku-shaped earthenware products are excavated from one archaeological site, and the fact that these were excavated from this archaeological site outside the dōtaku cultural area shows some cultural connection with the Tōkai region. In 2018, 121 items of Yayoi pottery excavated from this site were designated Registered Tangible Cultural Properties.

See also
List of Historic Sites of Japan (Saitama)

References

External links
 Wako city home page 

Yayoi period
Archaeological sites in Japan
History of Saitama Prefecture
Wakō, Saitama
Historic Sites of Japan